Amatitlania siquia, the Honduran red point cichlid, is a species of cichlid native to Central America. These cichlid can be identified by black melanin-based stripes in males and an additional bright orange spot on the abdomen for females. 

The size and pigmentation of the spots and stripes respectively correlate to proactivity within this cichlid. Darker stripes in males and smaller spots in females are characteristic of more proactive Amatitlania siquia. 

In 2019, scientists have shown that members of this monogamous species of fish develop a pessimist attitude when their partner is absent.

See also
Amatitlania
Cichlid
Convict cichlid
The Cichlid Room Companion

References

siquia
Fish described in 2007